Nabis pseudoferus is a species of damsel bug in the family Nabidae.

This insect shows promise as an agent of biological pest control against the South American tomato pinkworm (Tuta absoluta).

References

Nabidae